The Senior men's race at the 2010 IAAF World Cross Country Championships was held at the Myślęcinek Park in Bydgoszcz, Poland, on March 28, 2010.  Reports of the event were given in the Herald, and for the IAAF.

Complete results for individuals, and for teams were published. Updates were made to the original rankings of the senior men's race due to doping disqualifications of two Moroccan athletes.

Race results

Senior men's race (11.611 km)

Individual

†: Chakir Boujattaoui of Morocco was the original 12th-place finisher in 33:42 min, but was disqualified for a doping offence. His teammate Ahmed Baday, originally 29th before Boujattaoui's ban, was later disqualified for doping as well, which resulted in the removal of Morocco from the team rankings as it failed to have four valid finishers.

Teams

Note: Athletes in parentheses did not score for the team result.

Participation
According to an unofficial count, 135 athletes from 39 countries participated in the senior men's race.  This is in agreement with the official numbers as published.

 (2)
 (5)
 (1)
 (4)
 (1)
 (3)
 (5)
 (1)
 (6)
 (1)
 (6)
 (6)
 (1)
 (4)
 (1)
 (2)
 (6)
 (1)
 (1)
 (6)
 (1)
 (4)
 (6)
 (4)
 (6)
 (6)
 (5)
 (1)
 (1)
 (1)
 (6)
 (6)
 (1)
 (1)
 (4)
 (3)
 (6)
 (4)
 (6)

See also
 2010 IAAF World Cross Country Championships – Junior men's race
 2010 IAAF World Cross Country Championships – Senior women's race
 2010 IAAF World Cross Country Championships – Junior women's race

References

IAAF World Cross Country Championships
Senior men's race at the World Athletics Cross Country Championships